Gimcrack (1760 – after 1777) was an English thoroughbred racehorse.

Background
Gimcrack was a small grey horse at 14.2 hands sired by Cripple, a son of the Godolphin Arabian, his dam Miss Elliot was by (Grisewood's) Partner.

Racing career
Despite his small stature, Gimcrack was widely successful, winning 27 of his 36 races in a turf career spanning 7 seasons. Gimcrack won his last race in 1771, at age eleven, and he retired to the Grosvenor stud.

Stud record
Gimcrack sired the handy grey horse, Grey Robin who defeated Pot-8-os. His bloodline was more notable though in US horse racing than in Britain, via his son Medley.

After his death he was buried at Haughton Hall in Shifnal, Shropshire. A brick and stone pillar marks his grave to the west of the old walled garden.

Legacy
Gimcrack is best known from the paintings of George Stubbs.

The Gimcrack Club, in York was founded in 1766 in his honour, and the Gimcrack Stakes, also at York, are therefore also named after the horse.

References

External links
Gimcrack with John Pratt up on Newmarket Heath at the Fitwilliam Museum 
Thoroughbred Heritage - Portraits - Gimcrack

1760 racehorse births
Thoroughbred family 23
Racehorses bred in the Kingdom of Great Britain
Racehorses trained in the Kingdom of Great Britain
Godolphin Arabian sire line